The Brothers McLeod are illustrator Greg McLeod and writer Myles McLeod. They are British filmmakers represented by Sheil Land Associates and specialising in illustration, writing and 2D animation. They have been nominated for two BAFTA Film Awards for Best British Short Animation.

Career 

In 2008 they produced Codswallop which was nominated for a BAFTA Award for Best Short Animation at the 62nd British Academy Film Awards.

In 2011 they worked with the Royal Shakespeare Company to create a series of animations called Billy, featuring an animated version of Shakespeare and his pet pig Francis. The animations were commissioned as part of the reopening of the main theatre after a multimillion-pound restoration project.

In October they were nominated for another Children's BAFTA Award for Quiff and Boot, made with BBC Learning, which they went on to win.

2013 saw Greg McLeod animating one second a day for the whole year in a short animated film called simply 365. It featured numerous audio contributors including David Tennant, Adam Buxton and Lucy Montgomery.

In 2019 The Brothers McLeod were nominated for Best British Short Animation at the BAFTA Film Awards for their short film Marfa.
 
As well as working together on projects, the brothers also work on individual projects. Greg has exhibited at a variety of illustration exhibitions, including as an award winner at two Association of Illustrators tours (Images 33, Images 35). Myles also writes and develops material for other production companies, predominantly for children's television.

Selected filmography
 Circle Square (Animation) preschool TV series, 2021
 Honour Wave (music video), 2019
 Marfa, 2018
 The Inverted Peak, 2016
 365 – One Year, One Film, One Second a Day, 2013
 Phone Home, 2012
 The Existential Pleading of the Inner Heart, 2011–12
 Isle of Spagg, 2011
 Billy, 2011–16
 Quiff and Boot, 2011
 The Moon Bird, 2010
 Codswallop, nominated for BAFTA Award for Best Short Animation 2009
 Art Sparks, 2009
 Pedro and Frankensheep – CBBC TV series, 2008
 Fuggy Fuggy, 2005

Books 
 Knight Sir Louis and the Dreadful Damsel - written and illustrated by The Brothers McLeod, 2020
 Create Your Own Universe – written and illustrated by The Brothers McLeod, 2017
 Cats a Feline Compendium - written and illustrated by The Brothers McLeod with Fenella Smith, 2017
 A Book of Brilliant Ideas – written and illustrated by The Brothers McLeod, 2015
 Breeds: A Canine Compendium – written and illustrated by The Brothers McLeod with Fenella Smith, 2014
 Wuff! Ein Hundsverrucktes Handbuch – German Edition, 2015
 Breeds: A Canine Compendium – US Edition, 2015

References

External links
Official website

British film directors
Sibling filmmakers
Alumni of the University of Bristol
Alumni of the University of Southampton
Alumni of Bournemouth University
English animators
English film directors
English film producers
English screenwriters
English male screenwriters
British animated film directors
British animated film producers